Paraburkholderia phymatum is a species of bacteria that is capable of symbiotic nitrogen fixation with the legumes Machaerium lunatum and Mimosa pudica. Recently, the genome (8.67 Mbp long) was sequenced. It consists of two chromosomes (3.49 and 2.7 Mbp), a megaplasmid (1.9 Mbp), and a plasmid hosting the symbiotic functions (0.56 Mbp).

References

phymatum